Hervé Féron (born 3 August 1956 in Luxeuil-les-Bains, Haute-Saône) is a member of the National Assembly of France.  He represents the Meurthe-et-Moselle department,  is a member of the Socialist Party and of the  Socialiste, radical, citoyen et divers gauche parliamentary group.

References

1956 births
Living people
People from Luxeuil-les-Bains
Socialist Party (France) politicians
Deputies of the 13th National Assembly of the French Fifth Republic
Deputies of the 14th National Assembly of the French Fifth Republic